The Clue of the Missing Ape,  Gibraltar Adventure,  is a 1953 English children's film largely set in Gibraltar.  Directed by James Hill, it was produced by the Gaumont Specialised Film Unit, a descendant of the Gaumont-British film studio.  Players included veteran character actor George Cole.

Synopsis
The film centres on the adventures of Sea Cadet Jimmy Sutton, played by Roy Savage.  Sutton is seen walking down an English country path, and the sound of a boy's cheerful whistling are dubbed onto the soundtrack.  Soon a misfiring propeller engine is also heard and a World War II-style plane crashes in a field.  Sutton heroically rescues the pilot and retrieves a portfolio of important papers as the plane erupts in flames.  Two suspicious men can be seen sneaking away, trading dialogue that indicates they have sabotaged the plane.

The scene shifts to Gibraltar, where Sutton has been granted the right to enjoy a short vacation, courtesy of the British armed forces, as a reward for his bravery.  New challenges arise.  One of the first things that the garrison shows to Sutton are some of the Gibraltar apes, feral primates that have become the totemic animals of the armed forces base.  The local folklore is that if the animals ever die or disappear, Gibraltar will fall to Britain's enemies.  Young Jimmy soon finds that someone is indeed killing the primates.

With the help of a new friend, young local girl Pilar Ellis (played by Nati Banda), Jimmy tries to save the 'apes' and wake the authorities up to the threat they face.  It soon becomes clear that the cruelty to animals is only part of a much larger impending terrorist strike against the strategic naval base of Gibraltar.  The deaths of the monkeys are meant to serve as a feint to distract the Royal Navy from the imminent reality that the capital ships stationed at the base will be damaged or sunk by limpet mines that will be attached by skilled frogmen.

Sutton and Ellis have the task of saving Gibraltar from this sinister attack.  A series of chase scenes includes many of the key sights of Gibraltar as they existed in 1953, including the fortified spine of the Rock of Gibraltar and the Gibraltar water catchments.         
    
With the last-minute help of adults, the terrorist plot is foiled and the Royal Navy is saved.  The film's closing credits scroll to the accompaniment of Rule Britannia.

References

External links
 

1953 films
British children's films
Films set in the British Empire
Films directed by James Hill (British director)
1950s children's films
Films set in Gibraltar
Films scored by Jack Beaver
British black-and-white films
1950s British films